Resource and Energy Economics is a quarterly peer-reviewed academic journal covering energy economics and environmental economics published by Elsevier. It was established in 1978 as Resources and Energy and obtained its current title in 1993. The editors-in-chief are R.D. Horan (Michigan State University) and D. van Soest (Tilburg University). The journal was founded by University of Chicago economist George S. Tolley, and Tolley continues to serve as an honorary editor.

Abstracting and indexing 
The journal is abstracted and indexed in ABI/Inform, Engineering Index, Geosystems, INSPEC, Journal of Economic Literature, RePEc, Scopus, Current Contents/Social & Behavioral Sciences, and the Social Sciences Citation Index. According to the Journal Citation Reports, the journal has a 2012 impact factor of 1.495.

See also
 The Energy Journal
 `Energy Economics

References

External links 
 

Quarterly journals
Elsevier academic journals
Energy economics
Economics journals
Energy and fuel journals
Publications established in 1978
English-language journals
Hybrid open access journals